National Highway 727G, commonly referred to as NH 727G is a national highway in India. It is a secondary route of National Highway 27.  NH-727G runs in the state of Uttar Pradesh in India.

Route 
NH727G connects Harraiya, Babhnan, Swaminarayan, Manakpur and Gonda in the state of Uttar Pradesh.

Junctions  
 
  Terminal near Haraiya.
  Terminal near Gonda.

See also 
 List of National Highways in India
 List of National Highways in India by state

References

External links 

 NH 727G on OpenStreetMap

National highways in India
National Highways in Uttar Pradesh